The Netherlands has, in the light of assistance in criminal matters, concluded treaties for the extradition of suspects and fugitive convicts with several states. The treaties can bi- as well as multilateral. With some countries the Netherlands has both bi- and multilateral treaties at the same time. In those cases, most of the time the multilateral one is the most novel, and thus is the one applied. There are countries with which the Netherlands has a classic extradition treaty and countries which fall, together with the Netherlands, under the system of the European Arrest Warrant. Some countries do not extradite their own nationals. The Netherlands does.  Moreover, it even does not require reciprocity on the matter. The Netherlands will, however, not extradite when there is a chance the extraditee will be sentenced to death.

Types of extradition 

There are two régimes under which individuals can be surrendered to another state to stand trial or to undergo their sentence:

1. The régime of surrendering under the European Arrest Warrant. This régime is excusively applicable within the European Union and with Iceland, Norway and the United Kingdom. This system is based on Council Framework Decision 2002/584/JHA . The Netherlands has implemented this decision the Overleveringswet (Surrendering Act).

2. The régime of extradition is used for all other countries. In the Netherlands, extradition is exclusively possible if there is a treaty with the requesting country. The execution of the treaties is governed by the Uitleveringswet (Extradition Act).

Types of treaties 

There are, roughly speaking, four types of establishing dual criminality:

1. The enumeration system - In this system, the crimes which can lead to extradition are explicitly listed in the treaty. Dual criminality is however required.

2. The elimination system - In this system, there is no list. Dual criminality is established if the crime is punishable in both countries and is threatened with a minimum maximum penalty in both countries. The minimum maximum penalty is established in the treaty concerned. In case of extradition for execution, the treaty provides a minimum remaining term of sentence which still had to be served.

3. The combination system - These are treaties with a list and a minimum maximum sentence. If the extradition cannot take place because the maximum penalty in one of the countries does not fulfill the minimum established in the treaty, extradition can still happen if the crime is listed in the treaty.

4. All the above systems have the requirement that the crime must be punishable in both countries. Type number 4, the European Arrest Warrant (EAW), does not always have that requirement. Requests from other EU member states are treated like the above mentioned combination system, with the exception for dual punishability. This is not required for crimes on the list.

List of extradition treaties

References 

Extradition
Dutch treaties